Chen Xiexia (born January 8, 1983, in Panyu, Guangzhou, Guangdong) is a Chinese weightlifter.

Career
She won three golds at the 2007 World Weightlifting Championships. and the first gold medal for China in the 2008 Summer Olympics in the 48 kg class, setting an Olympic Record by lifting a total of 212 kg.

She also won 3 golds at the 2007 Asian Championships, with a world record of 120 kg in clean and jerk. At the Beijing University of Aeronautics and Astronautics Gymnasium on Day 1 of the Olympic Games, 152 cm Xiexia, 25, yelled "jia you!" (come on!), and succeeded on all six attempts (snatch: 95 kg; clean and jerk: 117 kg).

On 12 January 2017 it was announced that because of a doping violation she had been disqualified from the 2008 Olympic Games, and was stripped of her gold medal.  Chen Wei-Ling of Chinese Taipei, originally the bronze medalist, was awarded the gold medal instead.

References

1983 births
Living people
Chinese female weightlifters
Olympic weightlifters of China
People from Panyu District
Weightlifters at the 2008 Summer Olympics
Weightlifters from Guangzhou
Doping cases in weightlifting
Chinese sportspeople in doping cases
Competitors stripped of Summer Olympics medals
20th-century Chinese women
21st-century Chinese women